The Danish Sailing Association is the national governing body for the sport of sailing in Denmark, recognised by the International Sailing Federation.

Notable sailors
See :Category:Danish sailors

Olympic sailing
See :Category:Olympic sailors of Denmark

Offshore sailing
See :Category:Danish sailors (sport)

Yacht Clubs
See :Category:Yacht clubs in Denmark

References

External links
 Official website
 ISAF MNA Microsite

Denmark
Sailing
Sailing governing bodies
1913 establishments in Denmark